Love Is Blind (formerly titled Beautiful Darkness) is an American independent dark comedy-drama film written by Jennifer Schuur, directed by Andy Delaney and Monty Whitebloom and starring Shannon Tarbet, Aidan Turner, Benjamin Walker, Matthew Broderick and Chloë Sevigny. It is Whitebloom and Delaney's directorial debut. It was released on video on demand on March 25, 2019 in the United Kingdom, and on November 8, 2019 in the United States.

Cast
Shannon Tarbet as Bess Krafft
Aidan Turner as Russell Hank
Benjamin Walker as Farmer Smithson
Matthew Broderick as Murray Krafft
Chloë Sevigny as Carolyn Krafft
Mark Blum as Dr. Klienart

Production
Filming began in the Hudson Valley on June 8, 2015.  Filming was officially wrapped on July 6, 2015.

References

External links
 

2019 films
2019 comedy-drama films
American independent films
American comedy-drama films
Regency Enterprises films
Films shot in New York (state)
Films about psychiatry
2010s English-language films
2010s American films